Dyaus, or Dyauspitar (Devanagari द्यौष्पितृ), is the Ṛigvedic sky deity. His consort is Prithvi, the earth goddess, and together they are the archetypal parents in the Rigveda.

Nomenclature 
 stems from Proto-Indo-Iranian *dyā́wš, from the Proto-Indo-European (PIE) daylight-sky god , and is cognate with the Greek Zeus Patēr, Illyrian Dei-pátrous, or Latin Jupiter (from an earlier *Djous patēr), stemming from the PIE Dyḗus ph₂tḗr ("Daylight-sky Father").

The noun  (when used without the  'father') refers to the daylight sky, and occurs frequently in the Rigveda, as an entity.

Literature 
Dyáuṣ Pitṛ́ appears in hymns with Prithvi Mata 'Mother Earth' in the ancient Vedic scriptures of Hinduism.

In the Ṛg·veda, Dyáuṣ Pitṛ́ appears in verses 1.89.4, 1.90.7, 1.164.33, 1.191.6, 4.1.10. and 4.17.4 He is also referred to under different theonyms: Dyavaprithvi, for example, is a dvandva compound combining 'heaven' and 'earth' as Dyauṣ and Prithvi.

Dyauṣ's most defining trait is his paternal role. His daughter, Uṣas, personifies dawn. The gods, especially Sūrya, are stated to be the children of Dyauṣ and Prithvi. Dyauṣ's other sons include Agni, Parjanya, the Ādityas, the Maruts, and the Angirases. The Ashvins are called "divó nápāt", meaning offspring/progeny/grandsons of Dyauṣ. Dyauṣ is often visualized as a roaring animal, often a bull, who fertilizes the earth. Dyauṣ is also known for the rape of his own daughter, which is vaguely but vividly mentioned in the Ṛg·veda.

Dyauṣ is also stated to be like a black stallion studded with pearls in a simile with the night sky.

Indra's separation of Dyauṣ and Prithvi is celebrated in the Rigveda as an important creation myth.

See also
Dyēus
Rigvedic deities
Uranus (mythology)
List of fictional horses

References

Rigvedic deities
Sky and weather gods
Indo-European deities